Jaya Ganga (French: Jaya, fille du Gange) is a feature film made by writer, filmmaker and screenplay writer Vijay Singh.

The film stars Asil Rais and Smriti Mishra as leads.

Based on Vijay Singh's first novel Jaya Ganga, In Search Of the River Goddess (French:Jaya Ganga, le Gange et son double) Penguin Delhi/London 1985. Rupa & Co. Delhi 2005, 2021. Ramsay Paris 1985; Ginkgo éditeur Paris 2005, Rajkamal Prakashan Delhi 2021, the film has been shot on locations across Northern India, including Gomukh, Gangotri, Rishikesh, Haridwar, Chunar, Benares, and also in Paris and Limours, France.

Showcased at several film festivals across the world, it was first screened at the Montreal International Film Festival in the official competition category. Its first screening in India was at the 27th International Film Festival of India in New Delhi in January 1996, and it was later released in other cities in 1997. Its releases in India and Europe got it critical and commercial success. This was also the debut for its lead actress Smriti Mishra.

Plot
Nishant, a young Indian writer from Paris undertakes a journey along the river Ganges, right from its source in the Himalayas. Constantly haunted by the fantasy of a woman called Jaya from Paris, he meets Zehra, a poet and a dancer on the banks of the River Ganges. Zehra brings back the memory of Jaya and Nishant loses himself in her. Love takes over and he wants Zehra to be a part of his journey. While they are enjoying their journey, Nishant receives a telegram. And Zehra soon discovers how Nishant's fantasy could lead to a series of surprises....

Cast
 Asil Rais - Nishant
 Smriti Mishra - Zehra
 Paula Klein - Jaya
Vijay Singh- Sanjay
 Anupam Shyam - Bulldog

References
Notes

Bibliography
 Jaya Ganga, the book, exoticindiaart.com
 Jaya Ganga, film music, emusic.com

External links
 
 BBC
 Article in The New York Times
  Jaya Ganga, Stockholm International Film Festival

French romantic drama films
1990s Hindi-language films
Films based on French novels
Films based on Indian novels
Films set in India
1996 films
Films shot in Uttarakhand
Films shot in Uttar Pradesh
1996 directorial debut films
Indian romantic drama films